Deadline Auto Theft is a 1983 independent film written and directed by H. B. "Toby" Halicki made up of scenes from Gone in 60 Seconds and The Junkman as well as new material featuring Hoyt Axton.

Plot 
After the attempted theft of his daughter's fiance's car, LAPD Captain Gibbs declares war on master car thief Maindrian Pace. Meanwhile, Pace is hired to steal 40 cars, and must do so without being caught.

Cast 
 H. B. "Toby" Halicki – Maindrian Pace/Vicinski/Mr. Villis 
 Hoyt Axton – Captain Gibbs 
 Marion Busia – Pumpkin Chase 
 Jerry Daugirda – Eugene Chase 
 George Cole – Atlee Jackson 
 Lang Jeffries – Lt. Arthur 
 Dan Grimaldi – Carl Augusta
 Judi Gibbs – herself
 Pat Hartigan – Lt. Reed

Production 
Deadline Auto Theft was a piecemeal effort by Halicki to incorporate the opening chase of The Junkman into the film Gone in 60 Seconds. The film is essentially a trimmed alternate cut of his 1974 cult classic with a new subplot featuring Axton incorporated into it. The chase from The Junkman was depicted in that film as the making of a car chase picture – a case of meta-fiction; in Deadline Auto Theft, the footage is incorporated into the plot, essentially making this film the movie that was being produced in The Junkman.

External links
 
 

1983 films
1980s action thriller films
1980s chase films
1980s crime thriller films
American action thriller films
American crime drama films
American chase films
Films about automobiles
Films set in Los Angeles
Films shot in Los Angeles
American independent films
Films directed by H. B. Halicki
Metafictional works
1980s English-language films
1980s American films